The 2016 International Tennis Tournament of Cortina was a professional tennis tournament played on clay courts. It was the 3rd edition of the tournament which was part of the 2016 ATP Challenger Tour. It took place in Cortina d'Ampezzo, Italy between 1 and 7 August 2016.

Singles main-draw entrants

Seeds

 1 Rankings are as of July 25, 2016.

Other entrants
The following players received wildcards into the singles main draw:
  Lorenzo Sonego
  Gianluca Mager
  Karen Khachanov
  Francisco Bahamonde

The following player entered the singles main draw as a special exempt:
  Federico Gaio

The following players received entry from the qualifying draw:
  Viktor Galović
  Calvin Hemery
  Gianluigi Quinzi
  Andrea Collarini

The following player received entry as a lucky loser:
  Tomislav Brkić

Champions

Singles

  João Souza def.  Laslo Đere, 6–4, 7–6(7–4)

Doubles

  James Cerretani /  Philipp Oswald def.  Roberto Carballés Baena /  Cristian Garín, 6–3, 6–2

External links
Official website

International Tennis Tournament of Cortina
International Tennis Tournament of Cortina
International Tennis Tournament of Cortina